Dowlatabad-e Amanat (also Romanized as Dowlatābād-e Āmānat) is a village in Fahraj Rural District, in the Central District of Yazd County, Yazd Province, Iran. At the 2006 census, its population was 13, in 4 families.

References 

Populated places in Yazd County